Stryszów  is a village in Wadowice County, Lesser Poland Voivodeship, in southern Poland. It is the seat of the gmina (administrative district) called Gmina Stryszów.

The village has a population of 2,200.

References

Villages in Wadowice County